R55 may refer to:

Roads 
 R55 expressway (Czech Republic), now the D55 motorway
 R55 (South Africa), a road

Other uses 
 R55 (New York City Subway car)
 K-55 (missile), a Soviet air-to-air missile
 Mini Clubman (R55), a car
 R55: Toxic to fauna, a risk phrase